Grégory Christ (born 4 October 1982) is a French former professional footballer who played as a midfielder.

Career
In August 2016 it was reported Christ would be joining ROCCM of the Belgian Fourth Division.

References

External links
 

1982 births
Living people
Sportspeople from Beauvais
French footballers
Association football midfielders
AS Beauvais Oise players
Racing Club de France Football players
R. Charleroi S.C. players
MSV Duisburg players
Sint-Truidense V.V. players
Panthrakikos F.C. players
Újpest FC players
Ligue 2 players
Belgian Pro League players
2. Bundesliga players
Challenger Pro League players
Nemzeti Bajnokság I players
French expatriate footballers
French expatriate sportspeople in Belgium
Expatriate footballers in Belgium
French expatriate sportspeople in Germany
Expatriate footballers in Germany
French expatriate sportspeople in Greece
Expatriate footballers in Greece
French expatriate sportspeople in Hungary
Expatriate footballers in Hungary
Footballers from Hauts-de-France